Anders C. Hansen is a Norwegian mathematician, who is currently a Professor of Mathematics at University of Cambridge, where he is the head of the Applied Functional and Harmonic Analysis group, and also Professor II at the University of Oslo. He works in functional analysis, harmonic analysis (applied), foundations of mathematics (computational), data science and numerical analysis .

Education
Hansen studied mathematics at the University of Cambridge, University of California, Berkeley and the Norwegian University of Science and Technology, where he was awarded a PhD (2008), a MA (2005) and a BA (2002) respectively.

Career and research
He was a von Kármán instructor at California Institute of Technology from 2008-2009, held a Junior Research Fellowship at Homerton College, Cambridge from 2009-2012, and held a Marie Skłodowska-Curie Actions fellowship at the University of Vienna in 2012. Since 2012, he has held a Royal Society University Research Fellowship (URF) at the University of Cambridge, where he is now a professor at the Faculty of Mathematics, University of Cambridge and a Bye-Fellow of Peterhouse.

Among other results, he has established the Solvability Complexity Index (SCI) and its following classification hierarchy.
It is linked  to Steve Smale's question  on the existence of iterative convergent algorithms for polynomial root finding answered by Curt McMullen and Peter Doyle, as well as Alan Turing's work and the Arithmetical hierarchy.

Awards and honours
In 2017, he was awarded the Leverhulme Prize for having "solved very hard problems and opened new directions in areas of great impact in applied analysis [...] Notably, by introducing the Solvability Complexity Index he has made a major contribution to the advancement of Smale’s programme on the foundation of computational mathematics". In 2018, he was awarded the IMA Prize in Mathematics and its Applications for having "made a transformative impact on the mathematical sciences and their applications [...] in particular, for his development of the Solvability Complexity Index and its corresponding classification hierarchy". In 2019, he was awarded the Whitehead Prize of the London Mathematical Society for having "contributed fundamentally to the mathematics of data, sampling theory, computational harmonic analysis and compressed sensing" and "especially his development of the Solvability Complexity Index and its corresponding classification hierarchy 
".

Selected publications 
Research articles
 
 
 
 
 
 

Research expository highlights
 A. Bastounis, A. C. Hansen, D. Higham, I. Tyukin and V. Vlacic: "Deep Learning: What Could Go Wrong?",  SIAM News (October 2021).
 V. Antun, N. Gottschling, A. C. Hansen and B. Adcock, "Deep Learning in Scientific Computing: Understanding the Instability Mystery", SIAM News (March 2021).
 A. Bastounis, B. Adcock and A. C. Hansen, "From Global to Local: Getting More from Compressed Sensing", SIAM News (October 2017).

Books

References

Living people
Cambridge mathematicians
Norwegian mathematicians
Academic staff of the University of Oslo
Year of birth missing (living people)